Cylance Inc.,is an American software firm based in Irvine, California, that developed antivirus programs and other kinds of computer software that sought to prevent, rather than reactively detect, viruses and malware. Cyber Secure India described it as "the first company to apply artificial intelligence, algorithms, and machine learning to cyber security."

In February 2019, the company was acquired by BlackBerry Limited. After the acquisition, it will continue to operate as an independent subsidiary and will remain headquartered in Irvine, California. 

Cylance stated that their goal has been to "block computer viruses or malware before they have an effect on a user's computer".

Founding
Cylance was founded by Stuart McClure and Ryan Permeh in 2012. McClure was previously co-founder of Foundstone, a security consultancy. He sold Foundstone to McAfee in 2004, and became that firm's Chief Tech Officer. McClure is also the author of Hacking Exposed.

Cylance's founding came about as a result of McClure's speeches on cybersecurity. In them, he was often asked how he protected his own computer. He noted that he lacked trust in any security technology since it was all reactive in nature (for example, legacy antivirus technology), meaning it only cleaned up after an attack or prevented it a second time. Consequently, McClure began developing a technology based on "proactive protection".

Funding
A July 2015 report indicated that Cylance had raised $42 million from investors including Draper Fisher Jurvetson, Kohlberg Kravis Roberts, Dell, CapitalOne, and TenEleven Ventures. It received another $100 million in June 2016 with lead investors Blackstone Tactical Opportunities (part of The Blackstone Group) and Insight Venture Partners. They received an investment from In-Q-Tel in September 2015.

Product Features
McClure claims that Cylance's antivirus product does not use security features, such as unique signatures, heuristics, behavioral analysis, sandboxing, virtualization, or blacklisting. Rather, the product claims to use artificial intelligence to identify and stop attackers. McClure claims that its security features are similar to the human brain's way of identifying threats, wherein it "teaches" computers to identify indicators of an attack.

Operation Cleaver

Operation Cleaver was a covert cyberwarfare operation allegedly carried out by the Iranian government against targets worldwide, specifically critical infrastructure entities. Cylance published a report about the operation in late 2014. Iranian officials rejected Cylance's conclusions, but the FBI tacitly confirmed them.

MOTEX Collaboration
In May 2016, Cylance announced a new collaboration with MOTEX, an Osaka-based firm, to integrate MOTEX LanScope, an endpoint security management, and CylancePROTECT, Cylance's leading product, which claims to proactively detect and prevent malware. The end product will be called CylancePROTECT Cat.

Acquisition by BlackBerry Limited
In February 2019, the company was acquired by BlackBerry Limited for $1.4 billion.

Controversies

Malware Scandal
In November 2016, a systems engineer evaluated 48 files of malware samples provided by Cylance for testing their protection system "Protect", and found that 7 of them weren't malware. This led to an accusation that Cylance was using the test to look superior to its opponents by providing files that other products would fail to detect as malware. In response, Cylance executives said that they used repackaged malware samples for testing.

Honors and awards
The company has won several awards.

In March 2018, Cylance won the 2018 MSPWorld Cup Award.

In November 2017, LinkedIn recognized Cylance as one of the "Top Companies | Startups" of the year 2017.

In October 2017, Cylance was certified as a "Great Place to Work" on GreatPlaceToWork.com.

In September 2017, Cylance was announced a winner of the Gartner Peer Insights Customer Choice Award for Endpoint Protection Platforms by Gartner Inc.

In August 2017, Cylance made the Inc. Magazine's Inc. 5000 List for the second year in a row.

In May 2017, Cylance made the CNBC Disruptor 50 list for the second year in a row.

In March 2017, CylancePROTECT was named Best Endpoint Protection Product of 2016 by SANS Community.

In July 2016, McClure was named Orange County Entrepreneur of the Year in the category of technology.

In 2016, Cylance was ranked No. 23 on the Forbes Cloud 100 list.

See also
 Antivirus software
 Comparison of antivirus software
 Comparison of computer viruses

References

Computer security companies
Computer security software companies
Antivirus software
Companies based in Irvine, California
American companies established in 2012
2012 establishments in California
2019 mergers and acquisitions
BlackBerry Limited
2012 software